Nakhlestan or Nakhelstan may refer to:
 Nakhelstan-e Galleh Dar, Fars Province
 Nakhelstan-e Mohr, Fars Province
 Nakhlestan Rural District (disambiguation)